Lactucopicrin (Intybin) is a bitter substance that has a sedative and analgesic effect, acting on the central nervous system. It is a sesquiterpene lactone, and is a component of lactucarium, derived from the plant Lactuca virosa (wild lettuce), as well as being found in some related plants such as Cichorium intybus. It is also found in dandelion coffee.

As well as their traditional use as sedatives and analgesics, these plants have also been used as antimalarials, and both lactucin and lactucopicrin have demonstrated antimalarial effects in vitro. Lactucopicrin has also been shown to act as an acetylcholinesterase inhibitor.

See also 
 Lactucin

References 

Acetylcholinesterase inhibitors
Sesquiterpene lactones
Phenols
Enones
Lactones
Azulenofurans
Acetate esters
Cyclopentenes
Vinylidene compounds